Calumma amber, commonly known as the Amber Mountain chameleon, is a species of chameleons endemic to Antsiranana Province, Madagascar. The species was first observed in 1989 and was first described in 2006, and can only be found in the northernmost portion of the northern Diana Region of Madagascar, on and around Montagne d'Amber National Park. C. amber was originally considered to be a population of C. brevicorne.

References

Further reading
Raxworthy CJ, Nussbaum RA. 2006. Six new species of occipital-lobed Calumma chameleons (Squamata: Chamaeleonidae) from Madagascar, with a new description of Calumma brevicorne. Copeia 2006 (4): 711–734. (Calumma amber, new species).

amber
Endemic fauna of Madagascar
Reptiles of Madagascar
Reptiles described in 2006
Taxa named by Ronald Archie Nussbaum
Taxa named by Christopher John Raxworthy